The mixed doubles tennis event at the 2018 Asian Games took place at the Tennis Court of Jakabaring Sport City, Palembang, Indonesia from 19 to 25 August 2018.

Sania Mirza and Saketh Myneni were the defending champions, however both players chose not to compete. Aldila Sutjiadi and Christopher Rungkat won the gold medal, defeating Luksika Kumkhum and Sonchat Ratiwatana in the final. Anna Danilina and Aleksandr Nedovyesov, and Erina Hayashi and Kaito Uesugi won the bronze medals.

Schedule
All times are Western Indonesia Time (UTC+07:00)

Results

Finals

Top half

Section 1

Section 2

Bottom half

Section 3

Section 4

References
 Draw

External links
Official website

Tennis at the 2018 Asian Games